William Estus McVey, (born on a farm near Lee’s Creek, Clinton County, Ohio, December 13, 1885 and died in Washington D.C. August 10, 1958) was a Republican member of the U.S. House of Representatives representing Illinois' 4th congressional district from 1951 until his death.

He attended public schools; graduated from Ohio University where he was a member of Phi Kappa Tau fraternity in 1916 and from the University of Chicago in 1919.

He was division superintendent in the Bureau of Education, Philippine Islands, 1908–1914; director of extension, Ohio University, 1916–1919; superintendent of Thornton Township High School and Junior College, Harvey, Illinois, 1919–1947; president of North Central Association of Colleges and Schools in 1943 and 1944; professor of education at De Paul University 1948-1950; author; elected assessor of Thornton Township in 1949; elected as a Republican to the Eighty-second and to the three succeeding Congresses until his death in 1958. McVey voted in favor of the Civil Rights Act of 1957. He had been renominated to the Eighty-sixth Congress but died before the 1958 elections. He is buried in Linwood Cemetery, Galesburg, Illinois.

His first wife, Elizabeth King McVey, died of appendicitis on December 30, 1923 in Harvey, Illinois at age 38. He was later married to Katharine Johnson and was a member of the Episcopal Church, Phi Beta Kappa, Phi Delta Kappa and Phi Kappa Tau.

See also
 List of United States Congress members who died in office (1950–99)

References

External links

1885 births
1958 deaths
School superintendents in Illinois
Ohio University alumni
DePaul University faculty
University of Chicago alumni
Republican Party members of the United States House of Representatives from Illinois
20th-century American politicians
People from Clinton County, Ohio
People from Cook County, Illinois